Kjeld Bonfils (August 23, 1918 in Copenhagen – October 13, 1984) was a Danish jazz pianist and vibraphone player.

Bonfils was one of the figures involved in the "Golden Age" of Danish jazz in the 1930s. During the Nazi occupation of Denmark from 1940–45, jazz was discouraged by the regime, but Bonfils played with Svend Asmussen in Valdemar Eiberg's band, as well as elsewhere, and jazz became a symbol of the underground and political protest. Bonfils was hailed as one of the best soloists of his day.

References

Danish jazz pianists
1918 births
1984 deaths
20th-century pianists